Alvord Unified School District (AUSD) is a school district headquartered in Riverside, California, United States.

The district boundaries encompasses the western portion of the City of Riverside, the eastern portion of the city of Corona, and segments of unincorporated parts of Riverside County, namely Home Gardens.  The district was established in 1896, the first elementary school is now Alvord Continuation High School. The district office moved in February 2016 to 9 KPC Parkway Corona, California  The Instructional Materials Center, Warehouse, Nurses Office and Maintenance facilities remain at 10365 Keller Avenue, Riverside, California.

Schools

Continuation schools
 Alvord High School (Riverside)
 Alvord Alternative Continuation High School (Riverside)

High schools
 Hillcrest High School (Riverside)
 La Sierra High School (Riverside)
 Norte Vista High School (Riverside)

Middle schools
 Arizona Middle School (Riverside)
 Loma Vista Middle School (Riverside)
 Ysmael Villegas Middle School (Unincorporated area)
 Wells  Middle School (Riverside)

Elementary schools
 Arlanza Elementary School (Riverside)
 Collett Collett Elementary School (Riverside)
 Foothill Elementary School (Riverside)
 La Granada Elementary School (Riverside)
 Rosemary Kennedy Elementary School (Riverside)
 Lake Hills Elementary School (Unincorporated area)
 Christa McAuliffe Elementary School (Riverside)
 Myra Linn Elementary School (Riverside)
 Allan J. Orrenmaa Elementary School (Riverside)
 Promenade Elementary School (Corona)
 Phillip M. Stokoe Elementary School (Riverside)
 Terrace Elementary School (Riverside)
 Twinhill Elementary School (Riverside)
 Valley View Elementary School (Riverside)

References

 Southern California Railway Time Table No. 5 by Southern California Railway Employee Timetable 1890 
 Pacific Electric Corporate History 1885 – 1911 by Orange Empire Railway Museum
 Pacific Electric Railway Names and Locations of Stops, Cross Streets and Important Points of Interest by O.A. Smith, Passenger Traffic Manager 
  Riverside County, California, Place Names Their Origins and Their Stories by Jane Davies Gunther 1984 
 Landmarks of Riverside and the Stories Behind Them by Tom Patterson 1964 
 
 A Colony for California: Riverside’s First Hundred Years by Tom Patterson 1971

External links 
 

School districts established in 1896
School districts in Riverside County, California
Education in Riverside, California
1896 establishments in California